The New Hampshire Snowmobile Association is an association of independently incorporated snowmobile clubs.

History
In 2002, the NHSA successfully lobbied to have House Bill 1348, Chapter 253 enacted into law in New Hampshire. The law states that everyone who registers a snowmobile in New Hampshire needs to show proof of membership with a New Hampshire snowmobile club affiliated with the New Hampshire Snowmobile Association, or pay an extra $30.00 per snowmobile.

References

External links 
New Hampshire Snowmobile Association

Clubs and societies in the United States
Snowmobile Association